South Carolina Highway 127 (SC 127) is a  state highway in the U.S. state of South Carolina. The highway functions as a truck route of Laurens. In fact, it is the through route for truck traffic along U.S. Route 221 (US 221) and is concurrent with US 221 Truck for its entire length.

Route description
SC 127 begins at an intersection with US 221 (Greenwood Road). This is also the southern terminus of US 221 Truck south of Laurens within Laurens. The highways travel to the east and cross over Burnt Mill Creek. They curve to the northeast and have an interchange with South Harper Street Extension. After crossing the Little River, they meet US 76 (East Main Street); this intersection also marks the eastern terminus of US 76 Business. SC 127 ends here though US 76 and US 221 Truck continue to travel to the northwest of the city's downtown area.

Major intersections

See also

References

External links

SC 127 at Virginia Highways' South Carolina Highways Annex

127
Transportation in Laurens County, South Carolina
U.S. Route 221